The Finnish VR Class Hv1 (original classification 'H8') was a 4-6-0 express passenger train locomotive. 42 were built between 1915 and 1921. They were numbered 545–578 and 648–655.

Because of the increasing weight of trains, around 1910 there was a need for a more powerful passenger train locomotive, and the Finnish State Railways ordered a new design from Tampella and Lokomo. The initial maximum speed was 80 km/h but this was increased to 95 km/h in 1934.
Hv1 locomotives were in use on passenger trains throughout Finland for 50 years. The last of these locomotives was withdrawn in 1967.

The very similar locomotive types Hv2 and Hv3 were built later. The Hv2s were almost identical to the Hv1s, while the Hv3s had longer, 4-axle, 2-truck tenders.

Preservation

Locomotive No. 554 is plinthed in Riihimäki, and No. 575 is located next to the Lokomo factory gate in Tampere. The Finnish Railway Museum has locomotive No. 555 (Tampella No. 264), which was called “Princess”. It was in running order between 1995–2000, and is again from 2012 onwards.

Gallery

See also

 Finnish Railway Museum
 History of rail transport in Finland
 Jokioinen Museum Railway
 List of Finnish locomotives
  VR Class Pr1
  VR Class Hr1
  VR Class Tk3
 VR Group
 Rail transport in Finland

References

 
 
 Finnish Railway Museum Official website

Hv1
Railway locomotives introduced in 1915
Hv1
4-6-0 locomotives
Passenger locomotives
5 ft gauge locomotives